Charlot River Airport  is located along the Charlot River on the banks of Lake Athabasca, Saskatchewan, Canada. The airport is operated by SaskPower and serves the Charlot River Power Station, part of the Athabasca System Hydroelectric Stations. The closest community is Uranium City and the airport is serviced by Highway 999.

See also
List of airports in Saskatchewan

References

External links
Page about this airport on COPA's Places to Fly airport directory

Registered aerodromes in Saskatchewan